The 2022 DFL-Supercup was the 13th edition of the German super cup under the name DFL-Supercup, an annual football match contested by the winners of the previous season's Bundesliga and DFB-Pokal competitions. The match was played on 30 July 2022.

The match featured RB Leipzig, the winners of the 2021–22 DFB-Pokal, and Bayern Munich, the winners of the 2021–22 Bundesliga. RB Leipzig hosted the match at the Red Bull Arena in Leipzig.

Bayern Munich were the defending champions, having won the 2021 edition 3–1 against Borussia Dortmund. They successfully defended their title, winning the match 5–3 for their third consecutive and tenth overall title.

Teams
In the following table, matches until 1996 were in the DFB-Supercup era, since 2010 were in the DFL-Supercup era.

Match

Details

See also
2021–22 Bundesliga
2021–22 DFB-Pokal

Notes

References

External links

2022
2022–23 in German football cups
RB Leipzig matches
FC Bayern Munich matches
Dfl-Supercup
Sports competitions in Leipzig